Brasiliosoma is a genus of longhorn beetles of the subfamily Lamiinae.

 Brasiliosoma apicale Monné, 1980
 Brasiliosoma tibiale (Breuning, 1948)

References

Compsosomatini
Cerambycidae genera